Bellana Chandra Sekhar is an Indian politician. He was elected to the Lok Sabha, lower house of the Parliament of India from Vizianagaram, Andhra Pradesh in the 2019 Indian general election as a member of the YSR Congress Party.

References

External links
Official biographical sketch in Parliament of India website

1961 births
Living people
India MPs 2019–present
Lok Sabha members from Andhra Pradesh
YSR Congress Party politicians
People from Vizianagaram